Ancylosis aeola is a species of snout moth in the genus Ancylosis. It was described by Boris Balinsky in 1987 and is known from South Africa.

References

Endemic moths of South Africa
Moths described in 1987
aeola
Moths of Africa